Asyl Abdyjapar (born 1988) is a Kyrgyz chess player. He was awarded the title of International Master in 2013.

He has represented Kyrgyzstan in a number of Chess Olympiads, including 2012 (7/11 on board three), 2014 (8/11 on board 2), 2016 (6/11 on board one), 2018 (8/10 on board three).

He won the 2021 Kyrgyzstan Chess Championship.

He qualified for the Chess World Cup 2021, where he was defeated 2-1 by Benjamin Bok in the first round.

References

External links 
 
 Asyl Abdyjapar  chess games at 365Chess.com
 

1988 births
Kyrgyzstani chess players
Chess Olympiad competitors
Living people